Petr Baumruk (born 25 July 1962 in Ústí nad Labem) is a Czech former handball player who competed in the 1988 Summer Olympics and in the 1992 Summer Olympics.

References

1962 births
Living people
Czech male handball players
Olympic handball players of Czechoslovakia
Handball players at the 1988 Summer Olympics
Handball players at the 1992 Summer Olympics
Sportspeople from Ústí nad Labem
Czechoslovak male handball players